Howmeh Rural District is in the Central District of Shahrekord County, Chaharmahal and Bakhtiari province, Iran. At the census of 2006, its population was 23,397 in 5,833 households; there were 3,888 inhabitants in 1,133 households at the following census of 2011; and in the most recent census of 2016, the population of the rural district was 5,360 in 1,623 households. The largest of its five villages was Harchegan, with 1,996 people.

References 

Shahrekord County

Rural Districts of Chaharmahal and Bakhtiari Province

Populated places in Chaharmahal and Bakhtiari Province

Populated places in Shahr-e Kord County